Patrobus is a genus of ground beetles in the family Carabidae. There are more than 20 described species in Patrobus.

Species
These 21 species belong to the genus Patrobus:

 Patrobus assimilis Chaudoir, 1844  (Palearctic)
 Patrobus atrorufus (Ström, 1768)  (Palearctic)
 Patrobus australis J.Sahlberg, 1875  (Palearctic)
 Patrobus cinctus Motschulsky, 1860  (Holarctic)
 Patrobus fossifrons (Eschscholtz, 1823)  (Holarctic)
 Patrobus foveocollis (Eschscholtz, 1823)  (Holarctic)
 Patrobus lecontei Chaudoir, 1872  (North America)
 Patrobus longicornis (Say, 1823)  (North America)
 Patrobus obliteratus Gebler, 1848  (Russia)
 Patrobus platophthalmus Iablokoff-Khnzorian, 1970  (Russia)
 Patrobus quadricollis L.Miller, 1868  (Poland, Romania, and Ukraine)
 Patrobus roubali Maran, 1933  (Romania)
 Patrobus septentrionis Dejean, 1828  (Holarctic)
 Patrobus stygicus Chaudoir, 1872  (Holarctic)
 Patrobus styriacus Chaudoir, 1872  (Europe)
 Patrobus teresae J. & E.Vives, 2005  (Spain)
 † Patrobus decessus Scudder, 1900
 † Patrobus frigidus Scudder, 1900
 † Patrobus gasirowskii Lomnicki, 1894
 † Patrobus gelatus Scudder, 1890
 † Patrobus henshawi Wickham, 1917

References

External links
Patrobus at Fauna Europaea